The 2017 Gwynedd Council election took place on 4 May 2017 to elect members of Gwynedd Council in Wales. Seventy five council seats were up for re-election. In twenty one seats, the candidates were elected unopposed.

The Gwynedd election was on the same day as other 2017 Welsh local elections.

The May 2017 election in the Hendre ward resulted in a "historic" tie, with the Plaid Cymru and Independent candidates each winning 132 votes. The Independent candidate was declared the winner after a name was drawn from a pot by the returning officer.

Election results
Plaid Cymru held control of the council, with over half of the total seats, as per the table below:

|}

Council Composition

After the election

Lab – Labour
Lib – Liberal Democrats

Ward results

Aberdaron

Aberdyfi

Abererch

Abermaw

Abersoch

Arllechwedd

Bethel

Bontnewydd

Botwnnog

Bowydd and Rhiw

Brithdir and Llanfachreth / Y Ganllwyd / Llanelltyd

Bryncrug / Llanfihangel

Cadnant (Caernarfon)

Clynnog

Corris/Mawddwy

Criccieth

Cwm y Glo

Deiniol (Bangor)

Deiniolen

Dewi (Bangor)

Diffwys and Maenofferen

Dolbenmaen

Dolgellau (North)

Dolgellau (South)

Dyffryn Ardudwy

Efailnewydd / Buan

Garth (Bangor)

Gerlan

Glyder (Bangor)

Groeslon

Harlech/Talsarnau

Hendre (Bangor)

Hirael (Bangor)

Llanaelhaearn

Llanbedr

Llanbedrog

Llanberis

Llandderfel

Llanengan

Llangelynnin

Llanllyfni

Llanrug

Llanuwchllyn

Llanwnda

Llanystumdwy

Marchog (Bangor)

Menai (Bangor)

Menai (Caernarfon)

Morfa Nefyn

Nefyn

Ogwen

Peblig (Caernarfon)

Penisarwaun

Penrhyndeudraeth

Pentir

Penygroes

Porthmadog (East)

Porthmadog (West)

Porthmadog - Tremadog

Pwllheli (North)

Pwllheli (South)

Seiont (Caernarfon)

Talysarn

Teigl

Trawsfynydd

Tregarth a Mynydd Llandygai

Tudweiliog

Tywyn

Waunfawr

Y Bala

Y Felinheli

References

2017
2017 Welsh local elections